A first baseman, abbreviated 1B, is the player on a baseball or softball team who fields the area nearest first base, the first of four bases a baserunner must touch in succession to score a run. The first baseman is responsible for the majority of plays made at that base. In the numbering system used to record defensive plays, the first baseman is assigned the number 3.

Also called first sacker or cornerman, the first baseman is ideally a tall player who throws left-handed and possesses good flexibility and quick reflexes. Flexibility is needed because the first baseman receives throws from the other infielders, the catcher and the pitcher after they have fielded ground balls. In order for the runner to be called out, the first baseman must be able to stretch towards the throw and catch it before the runner reaches first base. First base is often referred to as "the other hot corner"—the "hot corner" being third base—and therefore, like the third baseman, he must have quick reflexes to field the hardest hit balls down the foul line, mainly by left-handed pull hitters and right-handed hitters hitting to the opposite field.

Fielding 

Good defensive first basemen, according to baseball writer and historian Bill James, are capable of playing off first base so that they can field ground balls hit to the fair side of first base. The first baseman then relies upon the pitcher to cover first base to receive the ball to complete the out. Indications of a good defensive first baseman include a large number of assists and a low number of throwing errors by other infielders.

In general 
The nature of play at first base often requires first basemen to stay close to the bag to hold runners or to reach the bag before the batter. First basemen are not typically expected to have the range required of a third baseman, shortstop, second baseman or an outfielder. As a result, first base is not usually perceived to be as physically demanding as other positions. However, it can also be a very hard position to play; a large amount of concentration and timing is required. Though many play at first base their entire career, it is common for veteran players to be moved to first base to extend their careers or to accommodate other recently acquired players. Facing a possible trade or a considerable reduction in playing time, a player will usually opt to move to first base instead. Catchers and corner outfielders are often moved to first base due to deteriorating health or if their fielding abilities at their original position are detrimental to the team.

Position 
Unlike the pitcher and catcher, who must start every play in a designated area (the pitcher must be on the pitcher's mound, with one foot in contact with the pitcher's rubber, and the catcher must be behind home plate in the catcher's box) the first baseman and the other fielders can vary their positioning in response to what they anticipate will be the actions of the batter and runner(s) once play begins.

When first base is not occupied by a baserunner, the first baseman usually stands behind first base and off the foul line. The distance he plays from the base and foul line is dependent on the current hitter and any runners on base. The exact position may also depend on the first baseman's experience, preference, and fielding ability. For a known right-handed pull hitter, the first baseman might position himself further towards the second baseman's normal fielding position. For a known left-handed pull hitter, the first baseman will position himself closer to the foul line to stop a ball hit down the line.

To protect against a bunt on the first base side of the infield, the first baseman will position himself in front of the base and move towards the hitter as the pitch is thrown. As soon as the pitcher commits to throwing towards home plate, the first baseman will charge towards the hitter to field the bunt. During these plays, it is the responsibility of the second baseman to cover first base.

With a base runner present at first base, the first baseman stands with his right foot touching the base to prepare for a pickoff attempt. Once the pitcher commits to throwing towards home plate, the first baseman comes off the bag in front of the runner and gets in a fielding position. If the bases are loaded, or if the runner on first base is not a base stealing threat, the first baseman will position himself behind the runner and appropriate for the current batter.

When waiting for a throw from another player, the first baseman stands with his off-glove foot touching the base, then stretches toward the throw. This stretch decreases the amount of time it takes the throw to get to first and encourages the umpire to call close plays in favor of the fielding team.  Veteran first basemen are known to pull off the bag early on close plays to convince the umpire that the ball reached his glove before the runner reached first base. The first baseman also has the responsibility of cutting off throws from any of the three outfield positions on their way to home plate. Though highly situational, the first baseman usually only receives throws from the center or right fielder.

Double play 

The first baseman is usually at the end of a double play, though he can be at the beginning and end of a double play. Unusual double plays involving the first baseman include the 3–6–3, 3–4–3, 3–2–3, or a 3–6–1 double play. In a 3–6–3 or 3–4–3 double play, the first baseman fields the ball, throws to second, where the shortstop (6) or second baseman (4) catches the ball to make the first out and then throws back to the first baseman who reaches first base in time to tag first base before the batter reaches first base. For a 3–2–3 double play, the bases must be loaded for the force-out at home plate or the catcher must tag the runner coming from third base out. With a force-out at home plate, the first baseman fields the ball, throws to the catcher, the catcher steps on home plate for the first out, then he throws it back to the first baseman to complete the double play. The 3–2–3 double play with a tag out at home plate is usually not attempted because of the possibility of the catcher not being able to tag the runner and/or block the plate. If the runner at third base is known as a good or fast baserunner, the first basemen will make considerable effort to make sure the third base runner does not advance to home plate for a run by "looking" him back to third base. The primary goal of the first baseman in this instance is to ensure the runner doesn't advance and that the team records at least one out, especially in a close game. A 3–6–1 double play is almost like a 3–6–3 or a 3–4–3 double play, but the first baseman is usually playing deep in the infield. Here, the first baseman throws the ball to the shortstop covering second, but the pitcher then has the responsibility of covering first base to receive the throw from the shortstop.

A first baseman can theoretically also make an unassisted double play. There are two ways to achieve this. The first is by catching a line drive and returning to first base to tag the base before a baserunner can return. This is rare because the first baseman is usually slower than most baserunners who generally return to their bases on line drives near any fielder. The second is by getting an infield hit to the right when there is a runner on first, tagging the runner and returning to the first base in time to get the man running towards him.

Left-handed throwing first basemen 

A left-handed throwing non-pitcher is often converted to or begins his career playing at first base. A left-handed throwing baseball player who is not particularly fast or has a weak arm (and therefore not well suited for playing in the outfield) will be relegated to playing first base. This is because the only other positions available to the player (catcher, third base, shortstop or second base) are overwhelmingly held by right-handed throwing players, who can make quicker throws to first base (or, in the case of catchers, third base).

The same advantages of being a right-handed throwing catcher, third basemen, shortstop or second basemen apply to the left-handed first baseman. These advantages surface in plays where the player is required to throw to another infielder after fielding a batted ball. In these instances, a right-hander will be required to turn more towards their target before throwing whereas a left-hander will usually already be positioned to make a throw. However, compared to the advantage for the right-handed throwing third baseman, shortstop, or second baseman, these advantages for the left-handed first baseman are minor because many balls hit to the first baseman are to his right, so that a right-handed first baseman fielding them backhanded does not need to turn after fielding a batted ball to throw it. In addition, a majority of plays only require the first baseman to receive a throw, not to field or throw himself. This is attributed to the overall majority of baseball players batting right-handed, and therefore, a majority of batted balls are hit to the left side of the infield and fielded by the third baseman or shortstop. Left-handed first basemen are also advantageous in attempting to pick off baserunners at first, as the left-hander can catch and tag in one motion, often doing both at the same time, while right-handed first baseman must sweep their glove across their body, costing them a crucial fraction of a second in applying the tag.

First-baseman's mitt 

The first baseman's mitt is similar to a catcher's mitt in that it has extra padding and has no individual fingers. (In shape, it is closer to a mitten than a glove.) It is much larger than the other infielders' gloves; it is wide, very deep, and it is crescent-shaped at its edges, allowing the first-baseman to use the mitt like a scoop in catching errant throws from other players on the infield.

Since many throws to first base are made in great haste, the first baseman must be prepared to catch balls that are either high or low, as well as balls thrown quite a distance to either side, all while maintaining contact with the base (using one foot or the other). This requires a fair amount of agility and physical coordination. Among the most difficult plays a first baseman is normally required to make are the "short hop" and the "tag play," both of which are far easier to execute when the fielder is wearing the first-baseman's mitt rather than another type of glove.

Short hop

Every ground ball hit to an infielder becomes a race between the batter-runner and the team in the field; the fielder must catch the batted ball and throw it to first before the batter can reach the base. Consequently, part of the first baseman's job is to step toward the incoming ball and stretch his body so that his catching hand makes contact with it as soon as physically possible. Compared to catching the ball while standing passively on the base, this shaves a fraction of a second from the time the runner has to reach base. When it is thrown too low and bounces before reaching the first baseman, catching the ball is difficult, especially while he is in a "stretch position". A throw caught shortly after its bounce, that is, while the baseball's path, rebounding from the turf, is sharply upward, is called a "short hop". Since a ball that strikes the ground is always subject to the possibility of encountering a pebble or a rut or a spike-mark that sends it in a radically new direction, it is best that the first baseman catch the ball on the short hop by swiping or scooping the ball as close to the ground surface as possible. This technique also minimizes the amount of time required to make the putout.

Tag play
The second-most-difficult play for a first baseman is the "tag play". Whenever an infielder's throw is so far off the mark that the first baseman must abandon his base to catch it, the first baseman is left with only two options. To put the runner out, he must either lunge back to the base before the runner reaches it, or he must tag the runner before the runner reaches the base.  A tag involves touching the runner with the ball (or with the gloved hand holding the ball) before the runner reaches the base.  At first base, the typical tag play occurs when the infielder's throw is high and to the left of the first baseman, causing him to jump and stretch his long mitt to catch the ball before it sails into the dugout or the grandstand.  The tag is made, after the catch, by swiping the mitt downward, toward the in-coming runner's head or shoulder, often in one fluid motion that is integrated with the act of catching the ball. Performed properly, the tag play can be spectacular to see.

As a career move
First basemen are typically not the most talented defensive players on a major-league team. Someone who has the agility, throwing arm, and raw speed to play another fielding position usually plays somewhere other than first base. Great-hitting catchers may play some games at first base so that they can hit in some games without having to absorb the rigor of catching every game.

According to Bill James, aside from pitchers and catchers, the most difficult defensive position to play is shortstop, followed by second base, center field, third base, left or right field (depending upon the ballpark), and finally first base as the easiest position. Anyone who can play another position on the field can play first base.

Lou Gehrig is an example of a player who played first base because he was not as strong a fielder as hitter. At or near the ends of their careers, good hitters are often moved to first base as their speed and throwing arms deteriorate, or their teams become concerned with the likelihood of injury. Such players include Hall of Famers Johnny Bench (originally a catcher), George Brett (third baseman), Ernie Banks (shortstop), Rod Carew (second baseman), Al Kaline (right fielder), Mickey Mantle (center fielder), Mike Piazza (catcher), Stan Musial and Willie Stargell  (left fielders) and Mike Schmidt (third baseman). Only rarely does a player begin his major-league career at first base and go elsewhere, as with Jackie Robinson, a natural second baseman who was played at first base in his rookie season so that he would avoid the risk of malicious slides at second base. Hank Greenberg, a natural first baseman for the Detroit Tigers, moved to left field in his 11th major league season (1940) after his team acquired Rudy York, another slugging first baseman who was ill-suited to play anywhere else.

References

Baseball positions